Collin is a small village between Dumfries and Gretna in Dumfries and Galloway, Scotland. It is located on the Lochar Water, and the A75 road. It lies 5.3 km east of Dumfries, and 20 km north-west of Annan. It has a cemetery. Rockhall Tower, a castle once owned by the Grierson baronets, is in Collin.

References

Villages in Dumfries and Galloway